Thorney may refer to:

Places in the United Kingdom
Thorney, Cambridgeshire
Thorney, Buckinghamshire
Thorney, Nottinghamshire
Thorney, Somerset
Thorney Hill, Hampshire
Thorney Island (Westminster)
Thorney Island (West Sussex)
Thorney Toll, Cambridgeshire

Other
ST Thorney, a tugboat